Telphusa nephomicta is a moth of the family Gelechiidae. It is found in South Korea, Japan and China.

References

Moths described in 1932
Telphusa
Taxa named by Edward Meyrick